The Metropolitan University College, also referred to as Metropolitan UC or MUC, is a university college offering a range of bachelor's degree and academy profession degree programmes in Copenhagen, Denmark. All programmes are taught in Danish except for a bachelor's degree in Global Nutrition and Health. A range of courses and modules in English are available to exchange students.

The Metropolitan UC is organized in two faculties with a total of nine departments. Its activities are spread out on a number of sites, in Nørrebro, Frederiksberg, and central Copenhagen. It has a total of approximately 9,000 students spread over 15 medium term higher education. The University College translates annually for approximately DKK 700 million.

History
Metropolitan University College was formed on 1 January 2008 through the merger of CVU Øresund, Nationalt Center for Erhvervspædagogik, Danmarks Forvaltningshøjskole, Den Sociale Højskole, Frederiksberg Seminarium and Suhrs into one organisation.

Department and programmes

Faculty of Health and Technology
The Faculty of Health and Technology is organized in five departments and offers a total of 11 programmes:

Department of Nutrition and Midwifery
The department is located on Pustervig (No. 8( in central Copenhagen and on Sigurdsgade (No. 26, Building B/C) in Nørrebro. It offers three programmes:
 Bachelor's Degree in Midwifery
 Bachelor's Degree in Nutrition and health (Ernærings- og Sundhedsuddannelsen)
Bachelor's Degree in Global Nutrition and Health

Department of Physical Therapy and Occupation Therapy
The department is situated in Sigurdsgade (No. 26) is Nørrebro. It offers two programmes:
 Occupation Therapy (ergoterapeutuddannelsen)
 Physical Therapy (fysioterapeutuddannelsen)

Department of Nursing
The Department of Nursing (Danish: Institut for Sygepleje) is located on Tagensvej (No. 86). It offers one programme:
Bachelor's Degree in Nursing (Sygeplejerskeuddannelsen)

Department of Technology
The Department of Technology (Danish: Institut for Teknologi) is located on Sigurdsgade (No. 26). It offers four programmes:
 Bachelor's Degree in Biomedical Laboratory Sciences
 Bachelor's Degree in Chemical and Biotechnical Technology
 Bachelor's degree in Emergency and Risk Management
 Academy Profession  in Chemical and Biotechnical Science
 Bachelor's Degree in Radiography (Radiografuddannelsen)

Institut for Velfærdsfaglig Efter- og Videreuddannelse

Faculty of Social Sciences and Education

Department of Education and Learning
The Department of Education is located on Nyelandsvej (No. 27–29). It offers three programmes:
Bachelor's Degree in Education
Meritlæreruddannelsen
 Bachelor's Degree in Natural and Cultural Heritage Management

Department of Social Work
The department is located on Kronprinsesse Sofies Vej (No. 35). It offers four programmes:
 Bachelor's Degree  in Social Work (Socialrådgiveruddannelserne )
 Socialrådgiveruddannelserne på Bornholm
 Socialrådgiveruddannelserne i Hillerød
 Forsknings- og udviklingsaktiviteter inden

Institut for Pædagogisk Efter- og Videreuddannelse 
The department is located at Tagensvej 18.

Department of Management and Administration 
The department is located at Tagensvej 18 in Nørrebro. It offers the following programmes (as well as a number of shorter courses):
   Academy Profession Degree  in Business and Public Administration
 Diplomuddannelsen i Offentlig Forvaltning og Administration 
 Diplomuddannelsen i Skat 
 Bachelor's degree in Public Administration (Akademiuddannelsen i Offentlig Forvaltning og Administration'')
 Akademiuddannelsen til Tolk

Locations

Tagensvej
The MuC's building ON Tagensvej (NO. 18-20) was originally built for the Danish Military Hospital in 1918-1928 to design by Gunnar Laage. It contains the MUC's administration as well as the Department for Science and Nature.

Nyelandsvej
The MUC's building on Nyelandsvej (No. 27–) in Frederiksberg is the former home of Frederiksberg Seminarium. The building was expanded by Cubo Arkitekter in 1996 - 1997.

References

External links 
 Professionshøjskolen Metropol
 Programmes

Higher education in Copenhagen
Colleges in Denmark
Universities in Denmark